Brain Drain is the eleventh studio album by the American punk rock band the Ramones, released on May 23, 1989. It is the last Ramones release to feature bassist/songwriter/vocalist Dee Dee Ramone, the first to feature Marky Ramone since his initial firing from the band after 1983's Subterranean Jungle and the band's last studio album on Sire Records.

Background 
In his 1998 autobiography, Dee Dee Ramone recalled: "It was tough recording the Brain Drain album because everyone took their shit out on me. I dreaded being around them. It drove me away—I didn't even end up playing on the album. Everybody in the band had problems; girlfriend problems, money problems, mental problems."

Johnny Ramone expressed similarly unfavorable sentiments in his 2012 posthumous autobiography, Commando, calling it one of his least favorite albums. He elaborated, "Bill Laswell's production is too dense; he had me record the guitars on five or six tracks. So the album took too much time, and there were too many Joey songs on it, which always took more time". However, he added that the album "has a couple of bright spots, like 'I Believe in Miracles' and 'Punishment Fits the Crime.'" He awarded both the Brain Drain album and its follow-up, Mondo Bizarro, a "C" letter grade.

For the first time on a Ramones album, drummer Marky Ramone participated in the songwriting, contributing lyrics to "All Screwed Up" and "Learn to Listen".

Songs 
"Palisades Park" is a cover song, originally recorded by Freddy Cannon in 1962.

"Pet Sematary" was written for the Stephen King movie adaptation of the same name and was issued as a single, becoming one of the Ramones' biggest radio hits and a staple of their concerts during the 1990s. Two versions exist of the song: the original recording produced by Jean Beuvoir and Daniel Ray, which ended up on the album (and on most pressings of the single), and the 'Bill Laswell version', a completely different take. The Laswell version was released as a UK single in September 1989.

"Merry Christmas (I Don't Want to Fight Tonight)" was originally released in November 1987 as the B-side of the single "I Wanna Live". It was later included in the 2004 film Christmas with the Kranks.

"Can't Get You Outta My Mind" dates back to the early 1980s, where it was first recorded during sessions for the Ramones' 1981 album Pleasant Dreams. That version remained unreleased until it featured as a bonus track on the 2002 reissue of Pleasant Dreams.

Reception 
Brain Drain was originally intended to be a "comeback" album for the Ramones, following the belated success of "I Wanna Be Sedated"; however, despite some good reviews, the album failed to live up to commercial expectations, peaking at number 122 on the Billboard 200 chart. Nonetheless, the album's first single, "Pet Sematary", became the band's highest-charting hit in the US, peaking at number four on the Billboard Modern Rock Tracks chart. Dee Dee appears as the bassist in both of the music videos for "Pet Sematary", while the videos for "I Believe In Miracles" and "Merry Christmas (I Don't Want to Fight Tonight)" feature his replacement, C.J. Ramone.

Cover versions 
"I Believe in Miracles" was covered by Eddie Vedder and Zeke for the 2003 album We're a Happy Family: A Tribute to Ramones and is frequently covered by Pearl Jam at their shows.

"Pet Sematary" was performed live by German industrial metal band Rammstein (in conjunction with Clawfinger) and was released as a B-side to their single "Ich will" in 2001. Rammstein was joined onstage by Marky Ramone, C.J. Ramone and Jerry Only of the Misfits when performing the song in New York as a tribute to Joey Ramone, who had died three months prior. The song was later covered by psychobilly band the Creepshow as a bonus track for their second album, Run For Your Life, in 2008. It was also performed by the Plain White T's for the 2012 film Frankenweenie (Unleashed). The end credits of the 2019 version of the film Pet Sematary include a cover version of the title track by the American punk rock band Starcrawler.

"Merry Christmas (I Don't Want to Fight Tonight)" was covered by Joey Ramone on his second posthumous album, ...Ya Know?, and by artists such as Smash Mouth (2005), the Smithereens (2007), Cheap Trick (2017), Little Steven and the Disciples of Soul (2017), Mattiel (2019), L.A. Guns (2019), and Lucinda Williams (2020).

Track listing

Personnel
Adapted from the album liner notes, except where noted.

Ramones
Joey Ramone – lead vocals (tracks 1–3, 5–13)
Johnny Ramone – guitar
Dee Dee Ramone – bass,backing vocals  lead vocals (track 4)
Marky Ramone – drums

Additional musicians
Daniel Rey – guitar, bass
Andy Shernoff – bass
Jean Beauvoir – guitar, bass, keyboards
Artie Smith – additional guitar
Robert Musso – additional guitar

Technical
Bill Laswell – producer (except tracks 7, 12)
Jean Beauvoir – producer (tracks 7, 12)
Daniel Rey – producer (tracks 7, 12), musical coordinator
Robert Musso – engineer, mixing
Martin Bisi – engineer 
Fernando Kral – engineer (track 7)
Don Peterkofsky – engineer (track 12)
Judy Kirschner – assistant engineer 
Robbie Norris – assistant engineer
Tony Maserati – assistant engineer (track 12)
Jason Corsaro – mixing 
Oz Fritz – assistant mixing engineer 
Howie Weinberg – mastering
Gary "Mudbone" Cooper – production assistant
Nicky Skopelitis – production assistant
Rachel McBeth – production assistant
Kim White – production assistant
Mark Sidgwick – production assistant
Matt Mahurin – front cover painting
Bill Fishman – inside photography
Rick Springer – Brain Drain logo
George DuBose – cover design and coordination

Charts 
Audio
 

Singles
Pet Sematary

Notes

References 

Ramones albums
1989 albums
Albums produced by Daniel Rey
Albums produced by Jean Beauvoir
Albums produced by Bill Laswell
Chrysalis Records albums